Studied by Marshall Space Flight Center in 1968, the Saturn V-Centaur booster would have been used for deep space missions if it had flown. It consisted of an ordinary Saturn V launch vehicle, except that the Apollo spacecraft would be replaced with a Centaur (known as the S-V in the plans) as a high-energy liquid-fueled fourth stage. This combination never flew.

References 

Saturn (rocket family)